Alessandro Mancini (born 4 October 1975) is a Sammarinese politician, who served as Captain Regent of San Marino, for a term of six-months, with Grazia Zafferani, from 1 April to 1 October 2020. Mancini additionally served for the six-months term as Captain Regent from 1 April until 1 October 2007, with Alessandro Rossi.

Mancini is a member of the Party of Socialists and Democrats.

References

1975 births
Living people
People from the City of San Marino
Captains Regent of San Marino
Sammarinese politicians
Members of the Grand and General Council
Party of Socialists and Democrats politicians